Sagenista is a group of heterokonts containing the labyrinthulids and Eogyrea, a class of yet uncultured protists. Originally, it contained the Labyrinthulids and bicosoecids. The bicosoecids have been removed, and Eogyrea were added, in order to make the group monophyletic.

Some have a special organelle called a bothrosome (or sagenogenetosome). It is usually found in a marine environments rich in algae and sea grass. It is capable of movement by use of this organelle.

They are generally decomposers. They are cultivated for their active production of Omega-3 fatty acids. These acids are used as an approved additive for animal feed.

There is a debate about whether some species of Sagenista contains the photosynthetic pigment chlorophyll C.

Bothrosome
They are capable of excreting an extoplasmic net of filaments for cells to glide upon. These tiny filaments provide a network for cells to travel upon to soak up nutrients from the surrounding environment.

Examples
Labyrinthula: Possesses a bothrosome. It is being studied for its pathogenic nature in marine environments. It has caused wasting disease in eelgrass, Zostera marina.

References

Bibliography

General Mycology. Dept. of Plant Biology, Washington State University.
Introduction to the Sagenista. Museum of Paleontology, UC-Berkeley.
Labyrinthulomycota. Department of Plant Biology, University of Georgia.

Regan, Casie. Vampire Scientists Study Sea Grass Slime Mold in Florida Bay. National Park Service.

Bigyra
SAR supergroup unranked clades